The Bangladesh Women's cricket team toured India for the first time from 2 to 12 April 2013. They played a three-match Twenty20 International series and a three-match One Day International series against India. India won both series 3–0.

Squads

T20I series

1st T20I

2nd T20I

3rd T20I

ODI series

1st ODI

2nd ODI

3rd ODI

References

2013 in women's cricket
India 2013
Bangladesh 2013
International cricket competitions in 2012–13
2013 in Bangladeshi cricket
Bangladeshi cricket tours of India
2012–13 Indian women's cricket